A transit of Deimos across the Sun as seen from Mars occurs when Deimos passes directly between the Sun and a point on the surface of Mars, obscuring a small part of the Sun's disc for an observer on Mars. During a transit, Deimos can be seen from Mars as a small dark spot rapidly moving across the Sun's face.

The event could also be referred to as a partial eclipse of the Sun by Deimos. However, since the angular diameter of Deimos is only about 1/10 of the angular diameter of the Sun as seen from Mars, it is more natural to refer to it as a transit.  The angular diameter of Deimos is only 2½ times the angular diameter of Venus as seen from Earth during a transit of Venus from Earth.

Transit
A transit of Deimos from Mars lasts a maximum of about two minutes, due to its relatively rapid orbital period of about 30.3 hours.

Because they orbit Mars in low-inclination equatorial orbits, the shadows of Phobos or Deimos projected onto the surface of Mars exhibit a seasonal variation in latitude. At any given geographical location on the surface of Mars, there are two intervals in a Martian year when the shadows of Phobos or Deimos are passing through its latitude. During each such interval, no or one transit of Deimos can be seen by observers at that geographical location (compared to about half a dozen transits of Phobos).

The shadow always falls on the "winter hemisphere", except when it crosses the equator during the March and September equinoxes. Thus transits of Deimos happen during Martian autumn and winter in the northern hemisphere and the southern hemisphere, roughly symmetrically around the winter solstice. Close to the equator they happen around the March and September equinoxes; farther from the equator they happen closer to the winter solstice.

Because it orbits relatively close to Mars, Deimos cannot be seen north of 82.7°N or south of 82.7°S; such latitudes will obviously not see transits either.

On 4 March 2004, a transit was photographed by Mars Rover Opportunity, while on 13 March 2004, a transit was photographed by Mars Rover Spirit. In the captions below, the first row shows Earth time UTC and the second row shows Martian local solar time.

The data in the tables below is generated using JPL Horizons. There is some discrepancy of a minute or two with the times reported for the series of images above. This may be due to imprecision in the ephemeris data used by JPL Horizons; also the JPL Horizons data gives local apparent solar time while the times reported above are probably some form of mean solar time (and therefore some of the discrepancy would be due to the Martian equivalent of the equation of time).

Note: the data below is valid for the original landing sites. To the extent that the rovers have moved around on the surface, the parameters of the transits as actually observed may be slightly different.

Near misses are in italics.

Observation by InSight
A transit lightcurve of Deimos was obtained 
  in 2020 using the solar array currents measured by the InSight lander. The light drop was about 0.9%  (possibly less than the predicted geometric obstruction of 1% due to light scattering by atmospheric dust outside the shadow). The transit lasted between 116 and 124 seconds.

See also
 Astronomy on Mars
 List of missions to the Moons of Mars
 Solar eclipses on Mars
 Transit of Earth from Mars 
 Transit of Mercury from Mars
 Transit of Phobos from Mars

Further reading 
 J. Bell, M. Lemmon, M. Wolff, Transits of Mars I and II, IAU Circ., 8298, 2 (2004).  (TeX DVI file is at ).

References

External links
 JPL Horizons (must use telnet interface for non-Earth observation points)
 Opportunity image gallery: Sol 39 (small images of the 4 March 2004 transit are near the bottom of the page).
 Spirit image gallery: Sol 68 (small images of the 13 March 2004 transit are near the bottom of the page).
 Spirit image gallery: Sol 420 (small images of the 9 March 2005 transit are near the middle of the page).
 Animation of 4 March 2004 transit

Astronomical transits
Deimos (moon)